Austria competed at the 1976 Winter Paralympics in Örnsköldsvik, Sweden. 24 competitors from Austria won 35 medals including 5 gold, 16 silver and 14 bronze and finished 6th in the medal table.

Alpine skiing 

The medalists are:

  Adolf Hagn, Men's Giant Slalom IV B
  Franz Meister, Men's Slalom I
  Josef Meusburger, Men's Slalom II
  Herbert Millendorfer, Men's Alpine Combination II
  Horst Morokutti, Men's Alpine Combination IV B
  Anton Berger, Men's Giant Slalom IV A
  Manfred Brandl, Men's Alpine Combination III
  Manfred Brandl, Men's Giant Slalom III
  Manfred Brandl, Men's Slalom III
  Adolf Hagn, Men's Alpine Combination IV B
  Heidi Jauk, Women's Alpine Combination II
  Heidi Jauk, Women's Giant Slalom II
  Heidi Jauk, Women's Slalom II
  Franz Meister, Men's Alpine Combination I
  Herbert Millendorfer, Men's Giant Slalom II
  Horst Morokutti, Men's Giant Slalom IV B
  Horst Morokutti, Men's Slalom IV B
  Peter Perner, Men's Slalom I
  Brigitte Rajchl, Women's Alpine Combination I
  Brigitte Rajchl, Women's Giant Slalom I
  Ursula Steiger, Women's Slalom I
  Anton Berger, Men's Alpine Combination IV A
  Willi Berger, Men's Alpine Combination IV B
  Willi Berger, Men's Slalom IV B
  Walter Laurer, Men's Alpine Combination I
  Anton Ledermaier, Men's Giant Slalom IV A
  Franz Meister, Men's Giant Slalom I
  Herbert Millendorfer, Men's Slalom II
  Franz Perner, Men's Alpine Combination III
  Franz Perner, Men's Giant Slalom III
  Franz Perner, Men's Slalom III
  Brigitte Rajchl, Women's Slalom I
  Ursula Steiger, Women's Alpine Combination I
  Ursula Steiger, Women's Giant Slalom I

Cross-country 

The medalists are:

  Wolfgang Pickl, Josef Scheiber, Eugen Wilhelm Men's 3x10 km Relay III-IV B

See also 

 Austria at the Paralympics
 Austria at the 1976 Winter Olympics

References 

Austria at the Paralympics
1976 in Austrian sport
Nations at the 1976 Winter Paralympics